The manga series Rin-ne is written and illustrated by Rumiko Takahashi. The first chapter premiered on April 22, 2009 in Weekly Shōnen Sunday and the last was released on December 13, 2017. The series focuses on Sakura Mamiya, a girl who gained the power to see ghosts after an incident as a child, and her classmate Rinne Rokudo, a boy of mixed human and shinigami heritage who helps lingering spirits finally pass on to be reincarnated. Shogakukan released 40 tankōbon volumes in Japan from October 16, 2009  to January 18, 2018. Rin-ne is licensed for an English-language release in North America by Viz Media, which published the chapters simultaneously online in English as they were serialized in Japan until March 17, 2011. Viz Media began releasing the volumes of Rin-ne on October 20, 2009, as the first title under their Shonen Sunday imprint, and published the last volume on July 13, 2021.


Volume list

References

External links 

 

Rin-ne
Lists of manga volumes and chapters